Davaadorjiin Tömörkhüleg (born 29 September 1990, Ulaanbaatar) is a Mongolian judoka who competes in the men's -66 kg category. 

He is a two-time winner of the Asian Championship, in 2013 and 2014, along with bronze medals in 2015 and 2016.  He had previously won a silver at the 2011 Asian Championships in the -60 kg division.  He also won two silver medals in the -60 kg division at World Junior Championships in 2008 and 2009.

At the 2012 Summer Olympics, he was defeated in the second round of the Men's -60 kg event by eventual bronze medalist Felipe Kitadai.  At the 2016 Summer Olympics, he had moved up to the men's half-lightweight (-66 kg) division.  In Rio, he beat Sulaiman Hamad and Houd Zourdani before losing to eventual gold medalist Fabio Basile in the quarterfinals.  Because his opponent reached the final, Tömörkhüleg was entered into the repechage.  He lost his match in the repechage to Antoine Bouchard.

References

External links
 
 

1990 births
Living people
Mongolian male judoka
Olympic judoka of Mongolia
Judoka at the 2012 Summer Olympics
Judoka at the 2016 Summer Olympics
Asian Games medalists in judo
Judoka at the 2014 Asian Games
Asian Games gold medalists for Mongolia
Medalists at the 2014 Asian Games
Sportspeople from Ulaanbaatar
20th-century Mongolian people
21st-century Mongolian people